Kendall Burks (born October 8, 1999) is an American professional soccer player who plays as a defender for Major League Soccer club Chicago Fire.

Career

Youth, college & amateur
Burks attended Stadium High School in Tacoma, Washington, where he earned Second Team All-Pierce County League as a freshman and First Team as a sophomore and a junior. As a junior Burks was also named Pierce County League MVP, First Team All-Region and All-State. He also played club soccer with Washington Premier FC, where he helped the team to four state titles.

In 2018, Burks committed to play college soccer at California State University, Bakersfield. In two seasons with the Roadrunners, Burks made 36 appearances and had two assists to his name. In his freshman season, he earned All-WAC Freshman Team honors. In 2020, Burks transferred to the University of Washington, going on to play 38 times for the Huskies, where he scored five goals and tallied four assists. In 2021, he was an All-Region Second Team and All-Pac-12 Second Team selection.

While at college, Burks appeared in the USL League Two for Seattle Sounders FC U-23 during their 2018 and 2019 seasons.

Professional
On January 11, 2022, Burks was selected 11th overall in the 2022 MLS SuperDraft by Chicago Fire. He didn't immediately sign with Chicago after the draft, instead going on trial with EFL Championship side Nottingham Forest. 

On February 25, 2022, Burks signed with Major League Soccer's Chicago Fire. He made his first team debut on April 19, 2022, starting in a Lamar Hunt U.S. Open Cup fixture against Union Omaha. He spent time with the club's MLS Next Pro team during their 2022 season.

References

External links 
 Major League Soccer Profile.

1999 births
Living people
American soccer players
Association football defenders
Chicago Fire FC draft picks
Chicago Fire FC players
Cal State Bakersfield Roadrunners men's soccer players
Major League Soccer players
MLS Next Pro players
Seattle Sounders FC U-23 players
Soccer players from Washington (state)
Sportspeople from Tacoma, Washington
USL League Two players
Washington Huskies men's soccer players
Chicago Fire FC II players